During the 1990–91 English football season, Middlesbrough F.C. competed in the Football League Second Division.

Season summary
In the 1990–91 season, Boro finished 7th in the Second Division on goal difference, qualifying for the end of season play-offs. However, they lost in the semifinals of the playoffs against Notts County.

Squad

Appearances and goals

Appearance and goalscoring records for all the players who were in the Middlesbrough F.C. first team squad during the 1990–91 season.

|}

Transfers

In

Out

Final league table

Results

Football League Second Division

Football League Second Division playoffs

Notts County won 2–1 on aggregate.

FA Cup

League Cup

Full Members' Cup

References

Middlesbrough F.C. seasons
Middlesbrough